SS Ouse was a freight vessel built for the Lancashire and Yorkshire Railway in 1911.

History

She was built by William Dobson and Company in Walker Yard for the Lancashire and Yorkshire Railway and launched on 21 September 1911.

She was requisitioned by the Admiralty between 1917 and 1919 when she operated as a decoy "Q" ship as Rule, Baryta, Cassor and Q35.

References

1911 ships
Steamships of the United Kingdom
Ships built on the River Tyne
Ships of the Lancashire and Yorkshire Railway
Ships of the London and North Western Railway
Ships of the London, Midland and Scottish Railway
World War II merchant ships of the United Kingdom
World War II shipwrecks in the English Channel
Maritime incidents in August 1940